Archer Kent Blood (March 20, 1923 – September 3, 2004) was an American career diplomat and academic. He served as the last American Consul General to Dhaka, Bangladesh (East Pakistan at the time).  He is famous for sending the strongly worded "Blood Telegram" protesting against the atrocities committed in the Bangladesh Liberation War. He also served in Greece, Algeria, Germany, Afghanistan and ended his career as charge d'affaires of the U.S. Embassy in New Delhi, India, retiring in 1982.

Early life and education
Born in Chicago, Archer Blood graduated from high school in Lynchburg, Virginia. He received a bachelor's degree from the University of Virginia in 1943, then served in the U.S. Navy in the North Pacific in World War II. In 1947, he joined the Foreign Service, and received a master's degree in international relations from George Washington University in 1963.

Career 
In 1970, Blood arrived in Dhaka, East Pakistan, as U.S. consul general. When the Bangladesh genocide began, his consulate regularly reported events as they occurred to the White House, but received no response due to America's alliance with West Pakistan, fuelled in part by President Nixon's personal friendship with the then-President of Pakistan, Yahya Khan, as well as by National Security Advisor Henry Kissinger's desire to use Pakistan's cordial relationship with China as a pathway to resuming American relations with China. Although Blood's initial cables failed to elicit a response from his government, they caused a stir with the American public when they were leaked, prompting Pakistan's foreign ministry to complain to the American government.

With tensions in East Pakistan rising, Blood saw the independence of Bangladesh as an inevitability, remarking that "the ominous prospect of a military crackdown is much more than a possibility, but it would only delay, and ensure, the independence of [sic.] Bangla Desh." After foreign journalists were rounded up and expelled from East Pakistan, Blood even sheltered a reporter who had snuck away so that events could continue to be reported, in addition to sheltering Hindu Bengalis being targeted by the West Pakistani forces, despite being warned by the American government to refrain from doing so.

Blood also played a role in the Soviet invasion of Afghanistan, though this may not have been known in the United States at the time. A report suggests that one of the two triggers for the invasion was "Amin’s reception of acting American Chargé d’Affaires Archer Blood on October 27" in 1979.

The Blood Telegram

The Blood Telegram (April 6, 1971), sent via the State Department's Dissent Channel, was seen as the most strongly worded expression of dissent in the history of the U.S. Foreign Service. It was signed by 20 members of the diplomatic staff. The telegram stated:

In an earlier telegram (March 27, 1971), Archer Blood wrote about American observations at Dhaka under the subject heading "Selective genocide":

Aftermath

Although Blood was scheduled for another 18-month tour in Dhaka, President Richard M. Nixon and Secretary of State Henry Kissinger recalled him from that position since his opposition went against their hopes of using the support of West Pakistan for diplomatic openings to China and to counter the power of the Soviet Union. He was assigned to State Department's personnel office. Government officials in 1972 admitted that they didn't believe the magnitude of the killings, labeling the telegram alarmist. His career was greatly marred by the telegram. He wrote the book The Cruel Birth of Bangladesh – Memoirs of an American Diplomat, about his experience during the Bangladesh Liberation War.

Archer Blood received the Christian A. Herter Award in 1971 for "extraordinary accomplishment involving initiative, integrity, intellectual courage and creative dissent". The Blood Telegram was also a precursor to the formation of the State Department 'Dissent Channel' that formed in the following years, a mechanism through which agency officials could express formal critiques of United States foreign policy.

Legacy 
Blood died of arterial sclerosis on September 3, 2004, in Fort Collins, Colorado, where he had been living since 1993. His death made headlines in Bangladesh. Bangladesh sent a delegation to the funeral in Fort Collins and Mrs. Blood received numerous communiques from Bangladeshis. His contribution in shaping the moral contours of American diplomacy in 1971 was acknowledged by The Washington Post in its obituary.

In May 2005, Blood was posthumously awarded the Outstanding Services Award by the Bangladeshi-American Foundation, Inc. (BAFI) at the First Bangladeshi-American Convention. Blood received this Award for his role in 1970 and 1971 for the cause of humanity and his brave stance against the US official policy while the Pakistan army was engaged in a genocidal mission in what is now Bangladesh. His son, Peter Blood, accepted the award on behalf of the family. This was followed on December 13, 2005, by the dedication of the American Center Library, U.S. Embassy Dhaka, in the name of Archer K. Blood. Present at the ribbon-cutting ceremony were Chargé d'Affaires Judith Chammas, Mrs. Margaret Blood and her children, Shireen Updegraff and Peter Blood.

In 2022 the State Department named a conference room at its Foggy Bottom headquarters in Blood's honor.

Publications
 The Cruel Birth of Bangladesh: Memoirs of an American Diplomat. Bangladesh: University Press Limited, 2002.

References

Further reading
 Sajit Gandhi The Tilt: The U.S. and the South Asian Crisis of 1971 National Security Archive Electronic Briefing Book No. 79 December 16, 2002 contains links to the "Blood telegram" and a number of other U.S. declasified papers of that time.
 US Department of State on Foreign Relations and South Asia crisis 1969-1976
 Joe Galloway: Rest in Peace Archer Blood, American Hero
 Obituary Washington Post
 Bass, Gary Jonathan, 2013.  The Blood Telegram. A Borzoi book.

External links
 Archer Blood's Bafi Award
 US Embassy - Dhaka, Bangladesh
 Documentation about the Bangladesh Liberation War and Archer Blood

1923 births
2004 deaths
American diplomats
University of Virginia alumni
Elliott School of International Affairs alumni
American expatriates in Pakistan
People from Chicago
United States Foreign Service personnel
United States Navy personnel of World War II
American expatriates in Greece
American expatriates in Algeria
American expatriates in Germany
American expatriates in Afghanistan
American expatriates in India
20th-century American diplomats
Allegheny College faculty